Ivachnová is a village and a municipality in Ružomberok District in the Žilina Region of northern Slovakia.

History
In historical records, the village was first mentioned in 1469.

Geography
The municipality sits at an altitude of 508 metres and covers an area of 5.894 km². It has a population of about 500 people.

Genealogical records

The records for genealogical research are available at the state archive "Statny Archiv in Bytca, Slovakia".

 Roman Catholic church records (births/marriages/deaths): 1687-1901 (parish B)
 Lutheran church records (births/marriages/deaths): 1783-1895 (parish B)

See also
 List of municipalities and towns in Slovakia

References

External links
https://web.archive.org/web/20071027094149/http://www.statistics.sk/mosmis/eng/run.html
Surnames of living people in Ivachnova

Villages and municipalities in Ružomberok District